Gniloye is a rural locality (a selo) and the administrative center of Gnilovskoye Rural Settlement, Ostrogozhsky District, Voronezh Oblast, Russia. The population was 1,028 as of 2010. There are 18 streets.

Geography 
Gniloye is located 10 km south of Ostrogozhsk (the district's administrative centre) by road. Blizhneye Stoyanovo is the nearest rural locality.

References 

Rural localities in Ostrogozhsky District